A postilion or postillion is a person who guides a horse-drawn coach or post chaise while mounted on the horse or one of a pair of horses. By contrast, a coachman controls the horses from the vehicle itself.

Originally the English name for a guide or forerunner for the post (mail) or a messenger, it became transferred to the actual mail carrier or messenger and also to a person who rides a (hired) post horse. The same persons made themselves available as a less expensive alternative to hiring a coachman, particularly for light, fast vehicles.

Postilions draw ceremonial vehicles on occasions of national importance such as state funerals.

On the battlefield or on ceremonial occasions postilions have control that a coachman cannot exert.

Mount
Postilions ride the left or nearside mount because horses are mounted from the left. With a double team there could be two postilions, one for each pair, or one postilion would ride on the left rear horse in order to control all four horses.

Livery
"The postilion wears a full-dress livery with a short jacket reaching to the waist only and decorated with gold lace and gilt buttons. A white shirt and stock tie, white leather breeches, white gloves, decorated cap, boots with brown tops, and an iron leg-guard on the (right) “leg to protect it from the battering of the carriage pole".

Purposes
 Much cheaper than hiring a coachman.
 Privacy for passengers in their conversations.

Special purposes

 Better control of the horses, for example, when moving guns at high speed on a battlefield.
 Extravagant display by their noble owner, as when attending a state occasion. The display might extend to liveried men walking on foot beside each horse.

Travel by post
This style of travel was known as "posting". The postilions and their horses (known as "post-horses") would be hired from a "postmaster" at a "post house". The carriage would travel from one post house to the next (a journey known as a "stage"), where the postilions and/or spent (exhausted) horses could be replaced if necessary. In practice unless a return hire was anticipated a postilion of a spent team frequently was also responsible for returning them to the originating post house.

Posting was once common both in England and in continental Europe. In addition to a carriage's obvious advantages (a degree of safety and shelter for the inside passengers and accessibility to non-riders) on long trips it tended to be the most rapid form of passenger travel. Individually mounted riders are subject to their personal endurance limits, while posting could continue indefinitely with brief stops for fresh horses and crew. In England, posting declined once railways became an alternative method of transport, but it remained popular in France and other countries.

Artillery
The gun detachments of the King's Troop, Royal Horse Artillery are each driven by a team of three post riders. The King's Troop is a ceremonial unit equipped with World War I veteran 13-pounder field guns drawn by six horses in much the same configuration as the guns of the 19th and early 20th century would have been. Officers and senior non-commissioned officers ride separately.

The United States Army's Old Guard Caisson Platoon also rides postilion. The section sergeant, on a separate horse, is in charge of the team and there are six other horses teamed together. This configuration is used at Arlington National Cemetery.

Derivative terminology and use
To adapt to the rigours of horses traveling long distances at a trot, postillion riders adapted a method of rising and falling with the rhythm of the horse's gait and given the name "posting" or "posting to the trot." "Posting to the trot" is quite different in action from the customary "rising to the trot".

See also
 Le postillon de Lonjumeau, an 1836 French comic opera by Adolphe Adam.
 "My postillion has been struck by lightning".  A comical phrase supposedly found in old-fashioned foreign language phrase books.
 Der Postillon, German satirical news site.

Notes

References

Bibliography

External links

Postillions for Coaches

Road transport
Obsolete occupations